The  was a successful plot by Nakatomi no Kamatari, Prince Naka no Ōe and others who conspired to eliminate the main branch of the Soga clan, beginning with the assassination of Soga no Iruka. It takes its name from the zodiological name of the year 645 during which the Taika Reform, a transformative event in Japanese Imperial history, occurred.

Assassination of Iruka
The assassination of Iruka took place on July 10, 645 (traditional Japanese date: 12th day of the 6th month of 645), during a court ceremony at which memorials from the Three Kingdoms of Korea were being read to Empress Kōgyoku by Ishikawa no Maro. Prince Naka no Ōe had made elaborate preparations, including closing the palace gates, bribing several palace guards, hiding a spear in the hall where the ceremony was to take place and ordering four armed men to attack Iruka. However, when it became clear that the four men were too frightened to carry out the orders, Naka no Ōe rushed Iruka himself and cut open his head and shoulder. Iruka was not killed immediately, but protested his innocence and pleaded for an investigation.

Prince Naka no Ōe pleaded his case before Empress Kōgyoku, and when she retired to consider the matter, the four guards finally rushed Iruka and completed the killing. Shortly afterwards, Iruka's father Soga no Emishi killed himself by setting fire to his residence. The conflagration destroyed the manuscript copy of the Tennōki and many other Imperial treasures which had been taken for safe-keeping by the Soga, but Fune no Fubitoesaka quickly grabbed the burning Kokki from the flames. Later, he is said to have presented it to Naka no Ōe; but no known extant copies of the work remain.

Response from Empress Kōgyoku and eventual abdication
The violence actually unfolded in Kōgyoku's presence. The Empress responded to this shock by determining to renounce the throne. Japanese society during the Asuka period was sensitive to issues of "pollution", both spiritual and personal. Deaths—especially a violent killing in close physical proximity to the Empress—were considered to have been amongst the worst possible acts of pollution—an event so stunning that it would have warranted days of seclusion in an uncertain process attempting to redress what would have been construed as a kind of profanity.

Although Kōgyoku wanted to abdicate immediately in favor of Naka no Ōe, on the advice of Nakatomi no Kamatari he insisted that throne should pass instead to his older brother, Furuhito no Ōe, or to his maternal uncle (Kōgyoku's brother) Prince Karu. Furuhito no Ōe resolved the impasse by declaring his intention to renounce any claim to the throne by taking the tonsure of a Buddhist monk. That same day—traditionally said to be July 12, 645, Furuhito no Ōe shaved off his hair at Hōkō-ji, in the open air between the Hall of the Buddha and the pagoda. At this point, Kōgyoku did abdicate in favor of her brother, who shortly thereafter acceded to the throne as Emperor Kōtoku (645–654). After Kōtoku's death Kōgyoku took the throne once more as Saimei (r. 655–661), before Naka no Ōe himself finally took the throne as Emperor Tenji (661–672).

Notes

References
 Aston, William George. (1896).  Nihongi: Chronicles of Japan from the Earliest Times to A.D. 697. London: Kegan Paul, Trench, Trubner. [reprinted by Tuttle Publishing, Tokyo, 2007. ]
 Brown, Delmer M. and Ichirō Ishida, eds. (1979). [ Jien, c. 1220], Gukanshō (The Future and the Past, a translation and study of the Gukanshō, an interpretative history of Japan written in 1219). Berkeley: University of California Press. 
 Ponsonby-Fane, Richard Arthur Brabazon. (1959).  The Imperial House of Japan. Kyoto: Ponsonby Memorial Society. OCLC 194887
 
 Sakamoto, Tarō, Ienaga Saburō, Inoue Mitsusada and Ōno Susumu. (1965). Nihon Koten Bungaku Taikei: Nihon Shoki. Tokyo: Iwanami Shoten. 
 Shimura, Izuru. (1998). Kōjien, 5th edition. Tokyo: Iwanami Shoten.  (cloth)
 Titsingh, Isaac, ed. (1834). [Siyun-sai Rin-siyo/Hayashi Gahō, 1652], Nipon o daï itsi ran; ou, [https://books.google.com/books?id=18oNAAAAIAAJ&q=nipon+o+dai+itsi+ran  Annales des empereurs du Japon.]  Paris: Oriental Translation Fund of Great Britain and Ireland.
 Varley, H. Paul , ed. (1980). [ Kitabatake Chikafusa, 1359], Jinnō Shōtōki ("A Chronicle of Gods and Sovereigns: Jinnō Shōtōki of Kitabatake Chikafusa" translated by H. Paul Varley). New York: Columbia University Press. 

Soga clan
7th century in Japan
645
Emperor Tenji
Rebellions in Japan
7th-century coups d'état and coup attempts
Assassinations in Japan